Charlotte Gregg (born December 1978/January 1979), also known as Charlotte Carr, is an Australian actress and blogger. She played the part of Charity Fernbrook in Home and Away, who was a member of The Believers cult and prior to that was a midwife. The character was in the show originally as a cult member but was brought back by force by Mama Rose to induce the labour of Tasha. Gregg also played Tracy O'Donnell, wife of Jarrod O'Donnell in the BBC commissioned Australian drama Out of the Blue. She also played the lead character in the 2007 romantic comedy All My Friends Are Leaving Brisbane.

Gregg, a food and health blogger, also co-authored the cookbook Bubba Yum Yum: The Paleo Way for New Mums, Babies and Toddlers with celebrity chef Pete Evans and nutritionist Helen Padarin. The book raised controversy after being called “potentially deadly for babies” by health experts.

Personal life

According to her MySpace page, Gregg was Miss Teen New South Wales in 1993 and graduated in 1996 as an alumna of St John Paul College, Coffs Harbour (New South Wales), (1991–1996).

Gregg married Australian Idol winner Wes Carr in April, 2012 and she gave birth to her first child Willow Harrison Carr in Sydney on 5 November 2012 at 11.49 pm, weighing 4.2 kg (9 lb 4oz).

Filmography
 Seconds to Spare (2002) (TV) - Beatrice
 Fat Cow Motel (1 episode, "#1.13", 2003) - Cathy/Rhonda
 All Saints (3 episodes, "Time and Tide", "Thicker Than Water" and "In Sickness and in Health", 2005) - Rebecca Rowe
 All Is Forgiven (2006) - Telephone booth 2 Woman
 Home and Away (5 episodes, 2006) - Charity Fernbrook
 All My Friends Are Leaving Brisbane (2007) - Anthea
 Underbelly (1 episode, "The Black Prince", 2008) - Lilla Rigby
 Out of the Blue (2008 TV series) (49 episodes, 2008) - Tracy O'Donnell
 Punishment (2008) - Susan Rogen
 Packed to the Rafters (TV Series 2009) - Elly
 Rush (TV Series 2009) - Shay
 Lowdown (TV Series 2010) - Selina
 Jucy (Film 2010) - Dimity
 Me and My Monsters (1 Episode: "The Next Big Thing" 2011) - News Broadcaster
 Dave's Dead (Short 2012)

References

External links
 Bubba Yum Yum with Charlotte Carr
 

Australian television actresses
1970s births
Living people
Australian bloggers
Australian women bloggers
21st-century Australian writers
21st-century Australian women writers
21st-century Australian actresses
Year of birth uncertain
Date of birth missing (living people)